Ernest Parker (14 November 1895 – 28 November 1965) was a British swimmer. He competed in the men's 200 metre breaststroke event at the 1920 Summer Olympics.

References

External links
 

1895 births
1965 deaths
British male swimmers
Olympic swimmers of Great Britain
Swimmers at the 1920 Summer Olympics
Sportspeople from Sheffield
Male breaststroke swimmers